Princess Sophie Caroline Marie Wilhelmine of Luxembourg (14 February 1902 – 24 May 1941) was the sixth and youngest daughter of Grand Duke William IV and his wife, Infanta Marie Anne of Portugal.

Life

Sophie was born in  Berg Castle, Colmar-Berg, Luxembourg. Two of Sophie's elder sisters reigned as grand duchesses of Luxembourg: Marie-Adélaïde and Charlotte.

Sophie married Prince Ernst Heinrich of Saxony, youngest son of the last Saxon monarch Frederick Augustus III and his wife Archduchess Luise of Austria, Princess of Tuscany, on 12 April 1921 at Schloss Hohenburg. Sophie and Ernst Heinrich had three sons, three grandchildren, nine great-grandchildren and eight great-great-grandchildren:

Prince Albrecht Friedrich August Johannes Gregor Dedo of Saxony (9 May 1922 in Munich;-6 December 2009 in Radebeul, Germany).
Prince Georg Timo Michael Nikolaus Maria of Saxony (22 December 1923 in Munich-22 April 1982 in Emden) married Margrit Lucas on 7 August 1952 at Mülheim. They have two children, five grandchildren and eight great-grandchildren. He remarried Charlotte Schwindack on 3 February 1966, from whom he was divorced on 6 February 1973. He remarried Erina Eilts on 26 March 1974. He has an illegitimate son and four grandchildren.
Prince Rupprecht Hubertus Gero Maria of Saxony (12 September 1925 in Munich-10 April 2003 in Picton, Ontario, Canada)

Sophie died on 24 May 1941 at age 39 in Munich of pneumonia. Following her death, Ernst Heinrich married secondly and morganatically to Virginia Dulon on 28 June 1947 in Paris.

Ancestry

References

 Généalogie des rois et des princes de Jean-Charles Volkmann Edit. Jean-Paul Giserot (1998)

1902 births
1941 deaths
Burials at Dresden Cathedral
House of Wettin
House of Nassau-Weilburg
Saxon princesses
Luxembourgian princesses
People from Colmar-Berg
Luxembourgian Roman Catholics
Deaths from pneumonia in Germany
Daughters of monarchs